James Clifford Maki (born July 7, 1950) is an American former ski jumper who competed in the 1976 Winter Olympics and in the 1980 Winter Olympics. He was born in Grand Rapids, Minnesota.

References

1950 births
Living people
American male ski jumpers
Olympic ski jumpers of the United States
Ski jumpers at the 1976 Winter Olympics
Ski jumpers at the 1980 Winter Olympics